The deepsea conger (Bassanago hirsutus, also known as the hairy conger) is an eel in the family Congridae (conger/garden eels). It was described by Peter Henry John Castle in 1960, originally under the genus Pseudoxenomystax. It is a marine, temperate water-dwelling eel which is known from the southwestern Pacific Ocean. It leads a benthic lifestyle and inhabits continental shelves and slopes. Males can reach a maximum total length of 100 centimetres.

References

Congridae
Fish described in 1960